The Rochester Grizzlies (formerly the Rochester Ice Hawks) are a Tier III junior ice hockey team in the North American 3 Hockey League (NA3HL). The team plays their home games at the 2,600-seat Rochester Recreation Center, located in Rochester, Minnesota. The team typically plays more than 45 regular season games, in addition to showcase and postseason games.

History 

The franchise originally joined the Minnesota Junior Hockey League (MnJHL) in May 1996 as the Minnesota Ice Hawks and played in Le Sueur, Minnesota, until 2002. The team was owned and managed by Michael Fatis and coached by Nick Fatis. The franchise moved to Rochester, Minnesota, in 2002 after the Rochester Mustangs of the United States Hockey League ceased operations. They officially changed their name prior to the 2009–10 season to the Rochester Ice Hawks.

Following the 2014–15 season, most of the active members of the Minnesota Junior Hockey League moved to the United States Premier Hockey League as part of a new Midwest Division. In May, the Ice Hawks were accepted as an expansion team into the North American 3 Hockey League (NA3HL) for the 2015–16 season.

In November 2016, head coach Nick Fatis, the only head coach in the history of the Ice Hawks franchise, stepped down for personal reasons. He was replaced by assistant Eric Hofmann. Hofmann was replaced by Chris Blaisius, formerly the head coach of the Willmar WarHawks, in December 2017.

After the completion of the 2017–18 season, Michael Fatis sold the franchise to the ownership of the Tier II North American Hockey League's Austin Bruins, consisting of Craig Patrick and Mike Cooper. The new ownership rebranded the franchise to match the Bruins and the team was changed to the Rochester Grizzlies. On April 23, they named Casey Mignone as the new head coach and general manager for the 2018–19 season. After one season, Mignone was hired as an assistant with the St. Cloud Blizzard in the NAHL and was replaced by Chris Ratzloff.

Season-by-season records

References

External links
Ice Hawks website
NA3HL website

Ice hockey teams in Minnesota
Rochester, Minnesota
Ice hockey clubs established in 1996
1996 establishments in Minnesota